The Quetta Electric Supply Company (QESCO) is an electric distribution company which supplies electricity to the city of Quetta, Balochistan, Pakistan. 

Abdul Karim Jamali serves as the current CEO of the company.

History
Quetta Electric Supply Company was founded by a group of private investors in 1928 during British India-era. The history of the company goes back to 1891, when two DC generators were erected to supply power to Quetta Staff College, became the first city in what is now Pakistan to have an electric supply. It was publicly listed on Karachi Stock Exchange until 1981 when it was de-listed from the exchange.

See also 

 List of electric supply companies in Pakistan

References

External links

 Official website

Distribution companies of Pakistan
Quetta
Government-owned companies of Pakistan
Energy in Balochistan, Pakistan
Companies established in 1928
1928 establishments in British India